Mushuk March  is a Village in north-eastern Afghanistan . It is located in Khwahan District to Badakhshan province.

See also
Badakhshan Province

References

External links
March/ Satellite map at Maplandia.com

Populated places in Khwahan District